The 105th Wisconsin Legislature convened from January 12, 2021, to March 1, 2022, in regular session.  The Legislature also held two extraordinary sessions and six special sessions during the term.

Senators representing even-numbered districts were newly elected for this session and were serving the first two years of a four-year term.  Assembly members were elected to a two-year term.  Assembly members and even-numbered senators were elected in the general election of November 3, 2020. Senators representing odd-numbered districts were serving the third and fourth year of their four-year term, having been elected in the general election held on November 6, 2018.

Major events
 January 6, 2021: The United States Capitol was overrun by rioters attempting to stop the counting of electoral college votes.
 January 13, 2021: The United States House of Representatives voted to impeach U.S. President Donald Trump for "incitement of insurrection".
 January 20, 2021: Inauguration of Joe Biden as the 46th President of the United States.
 February 1, 2021: A coup d'état in Myanmar removed Aung San Suu Kyi from power and restored military rule.
 February 13, 2021: In the United States Senate, the impeachment trial of former U.S. President Donald Trump ended with a verdict of "not guilty".
 February 22, 2021: 500,000th U.S. death from COVID-19.
 March 11, 2021: U.S. President Joe Biden signed into law the American Rescue Plan Act of 2021.
 April 17, 2021: The global death toll from COVID-19 surpassed 3 million.
 May 19, 2021: Governor Tony Evers called a special session of the Legislature to consider a bill to adopt Medicaid expansion.
 June 29, 2021: Governor Tony Evers vetoed an act of the Legislature which would have ended federal supplemental unemployment benefits funded under the American Rescue Plan Act of 2021.
 July 7, 2021: President Jovenel Moïse of Haiti was assassinated at his home in Pétion-Ville.
 July 27, 2021: The Wisconsin Legislature met in extraordinary session and failed to override the veto of an act which would have ended federal supplemental unemployment benefits.
 August 30, 2021: The United States withdrew its last remaining troops from Kabul, Afghanistan, ending their 20 year war.
 November 1, 2021: The global death toll from COVID-19 surpassed 5 million.
 November 21, 2021: The Waukesha Christmas parade attack in Waukesha, Wisconsin, resulted in six deaths and 62 injuries.
 February 24, 2022: Military forces of Russia invaded Ukraine, initiating the Russo-Ukrainian War.
 March 3, 2022: The Wisconsin Supreme Court selected new district maps for Wisconsin's legislative and congressional districts.
 March 23, 2022: The United States Supreme Court struck down the legislative map chosen by the Wisconsin Supreme Court.
 April 15, 2022: After the U.S. Supreme Court decision, the Wisconsin Supreme Court selected the Republican redistricting plan.
 June 8, 2022: Wisconsin Governor Tony Evers called a special session of the Legislature to repeal Wisconsin's abortion ban.
 September 21, 2022: Wisconsin Governor Tony Evers called a special session of the Legislature to propose an amendment to the Wisconsin Constitution to allow citizen petition-initiated amendments to the state Constitution.
 November 8, 2022: Tony Evers re-elected as Governor of Wisconsin.

Major legislation
 July 8, 2021: An Act relating to: state finances and appropriations, constituting the executive budget act of the 2021 legislature, 2021 Act 58.

Party summary

Senate

Assembly

Sessions 
 Regular session: January 12, 2021March 1, 2022
 January 2021 special session: January 19, 2021February 11, 2021
 February 2021 extraordinary session: February 5, 2021April 1, 2021 
 May 2021 special session: May 24, 2021May 25, 2021
 June 2021 extraordinary session: June 29, 2021July 27, 2021
 July 2021 special session: July 27, 2021
 March 2022 special session: March 8, 2022
 June 2022 special session: June 22, 2022
 October 2022 special session: October 4, 2022

Leaders

Senate leadership 
 President: Chris Kapenga (R)
 President pro tempore: Patrick Testin (R)

Majority leadership 
 Majority Leader: Devin LeMahieu (R)
 Assistant Majority Leader: Dan Feyen (R)
 Majority Caucus Chair: Van H. Wanggaard (R)
 Majority Caucus Vice Chair: Kathy Bernier (R)

Minority leadership 
 Minority Leader: Janet Bewley (D)
 Assistant Minority Leader: Janis Ringhand (D)
 Minority Caucus Chair: Jeff Smith (D)
 Minority Caucus Vice Chair: Melissa Agard (D)

Assembly leadership 
 Speaker: Robin Vos (R)
 Speaker pro tempore: Tyler August (R)

Majority leadership 
 Majority Leader: Jim Steineke (R) (until Jul. 27, 2022)
 After Jul. 27, 2022: --Vacant--
 Assistant Majority Leader: Kevin David Petersen (R)
 Majority Caucus Chair: Tyler Vorpagel (R) (until Jul. 27, 2022)
 After Jul. 27, 2022: --Vacant--

Minority leadership 
 Minority Leader: Gordon Hintz (D) (until Jan. 10, 2022)
 After Jan. 10, 2022: Greta Neubauer (D)
 Assistant Minority Leader: Dianne Hesselbein (D) (until Jan. 10, 2022)
 After Jan. 10, 2022: Kalan Haywood (D)
 Minority Caucus Chair: Mark Spreitzer (D)

Members

Members of the Senate 
Members of the Senate for the 105th Wisconsin Legislature:

Members of the Assembly 
Members of the Assembly for the 105th Wisconsin Legislature:

Employees

Senate employees 
 Chief Clerk: Michael Queensland
 Sergeant at Arms: Ted Blazel

Assembly employees 
 Chief Clerk: Kay Inabnet
 Sergeant at Arms: Anne Tonnon Byers

See also 
 2018 Wisconsin elections
 2018 Wisconsin State Senate election
 2020 Wisconsin elections
 2020 Wisconsin State Senate election
 2020 Wisconsin State Assembly election

Notes

References

External links 
 2021: Related Documents from Wisconsin Legislature
 Wisconsin State Senate
 Wisconsin State Assembly

2021 establishments in Wisconsin
Wisconsin
Wisconsin
Wisconsin legislative sessions